Keet may refer to:

 Keet, a name for some types of parakeet
 Keet, a young guineafowl 
 KEET, a television station in California
 Keet, an orca
 Blauwe Keet, a Dutch hamlet

People
 BB Keet, Afrikaner theologian
 Darren Keet, South African association football player
 Jim Keet, American politician